The cokernel of a linear mapping of vector spaces  is the quotient space  of the codomain of  by the image of .

Cokernels are dual to the kernels of category theory, hence the name: the kernel is a subobject of the domain (it maps to the domain), while the cokernel is a quotient object of the codomain (it maps from the codomain).

Intuitively, given an equation  that one is seeking to solve, the cokernel measures the constraints that  must satisfy for this equation to have a solution – the obstructions to a solution – while the kernel measures the degrees of freedom in a solution, if one exists. This is elaborated in intuition, below.

More generally, the cokernel of a morphism  in some category (e.g. a homomorphism between groups or a bounded linear operator between Hilbert spaces) is an object  and a morphism  such that the composition  is the zero morphism of the category, and furthermore  is universal with respect to this property.

In topological settings, such as with bounded linear operators between Hilbert spaces, one typically has to take the closure of the image before passing to the quotient.

Formal definition 
One can define the cokernel in the general framework of category theory. In order for the definition to make sense the category in question must have zero morphisms.

Explicitly, this means the following.

commutes. Moreover, the morphism  must be universal for this diagram, i.e. any other such  can be obtained by composing  with a unique morphism :

Like all coequalizers, the cokernel  is necessarily an epimorphism. Conversely an epimorphism is called normal (or conormal) if it is the cokernel of some morphism. A category is called conormal if every epimorphism is normal (e.g. the category of groups is conormal).

 Examples 
In the case of abelian groups, since every subgroup is normal, the cokernel is just  modulo the image of :

 Special cases 
In a preadditive category, it makes sense to add and subtract morphisms.

 

In an abelian category (a special kind of preadditive category) the image and coimage of a morphism  are given by

In particular, every abelian category is normal (and conormal as well). That is, every monomorphism  can be written as the kernel of some morphism. Specifically,  is the kernel of its own cokernel:

Intuition
The cokernel can be thought of as the space of constraints that an equation must satisfy, as the space of obstructions, just as the kernel is the space of solutions.Formally, one may connect the kernel and the cokernel of a map  by the exact sequence

These can be interpreted thus: given a linear equation  to solve,
 the cokernel is the space of constraints on w that must be satisfied if the equation is to have a solution, and its dimension is the number of independent constraints that must be satisfied for the equation to have a solution.

The dimension of the cokernel plus the dimension of the image (the rank) add up to the dimension of the target space, as the dimension of the quotient space  is simply the dimension of the space minus the dimension of the image.

Additionally, the cokernel can be thought of as something that "detects" surjections in the same way that the kernel "detects" injections. A map is injective if and only if its kernel is trivial, and a map is surjective if and only if its cokernel is trivial, or in other words, if .

 References 
Saunders Mac Lane: Categories for the Working Mathematician'', Second Edition, 1978, p. 64
Emily Riehl: Category Theory in Context, Aurora Modern Math Originals, 2014, p. 82, p. 139 footnote 8.

Abstract algebra
Category theory
Isomorphism theorems

de:Kern (Algebra)#Kokern